Tamara Buciuceanu-Botez (10 August 1929 – 15 October 2019) was a Romanian stage, screen and television actress, as well a known TV personality. She was one of the most successful Romanian actresses of the 1960s–2000s who worked at Odeon Theatre, known for Liceenii (1986),  (1992), Silent Wedding (2008) and Everybody in Our Family (2012).

Biography 
In 1948–1951, she attended Iasi Theatre Institute "Vasile Alecsandri", but being at the fourth year, she decided to move to Bucharest to the Institute of Theater and Cinematography and to attend the class of professor Nicolae Balteteanu (Sorana Coroama-Stanca assistant). Tamara Buciuceanu graduated in 1952. She is one of the representatives of the golden generation of the Romanian theater. She is called "The Lady of the Romanian Comedy", being one of the legendary figures of the comedy theater. She has starred in more than 25 films, and her emblematic character being Isoscel teacher from the "Liceenii" series. In 2009, at her 80-year-old anniversary she also celebrated the 57-year-long career jubilee in drama and film.

She performed on the stages of Giulesti, Bulandra, and National and of the Comedy theaters, etc. She also performed in Coana Chiriţa role on the stage of the Iași National Theatre.

Death
On 15 October 2019, Tamara Buciuceanu died at the Elias Hospital in Bucharest due to serious heart problems.

Filmography     
 Titanic Waltz (1964)
 Anecdota (1972) - TV film 
 Scorpia (1973) - TV film 
 Vegetarian (1973) 
 La spațiul locativ (1975) - TV film 
 Doctor fără voie (1976) - TV film 
 Ma-ma (1976)
 Ultimele zile ale verii (1976)
 Domnișoara Nastasia (1976) - TV film 
 Premiera (1976)
 Serenadă pentru etajul XII (1976)
 Toate pînzele sus (TV series, 1977) - ep. 2, 12
 Vis de ianuarie (1978)
 Melodii, melodii (1978)
 Blestemul pământului, blestemul iubirii (1979) - Maria Herdelea
 Cântec pentru fiul meu (1980)
 Alo, aterizează străbunica!... (1981)
 De ce trag clopotele, Mitică? (1981)
 Grăbește-te încet (1981)
 Înghițitorul de săbii (1981)
 Șantaj (1981) 
 Prea tineri pentru riduri (1982) 
 Chirița în provincie (1982) - TV play
 Sfantul Mitica Blajinu (1982) -  TV play 
 Bocet vesel (1983)
 Declarație de dragoste (1985) - Isoscel
 Cuibul de viespi (1986)  
 Liceenii (1986) - Isoscel
 Primăvara bobocilor (1987) - Varvara
 Punct și de la capăt (1987)
 Extemporal la dirigenție (1988) - Isoscel
 Dimineața pierdută (1990) -  TV play
 Liceenii Rock'n'Roll (1991) - Isoscel
 Titanic vals (1993) -  TV movie 
 Liceenii în alertă (1993) - Isoscel
 Paradisul în direct (1994) 
 Sexy Harem Ada-Kaleh (2001)
 Lazy Town (2004-2014) - Bessie Busybody (Romanian dub)
 Agenția matrimonială (2005) -  TV series 
 Cuscrele (2005) - TV series - Mathilda Baboniu 
 Inimă de țigan (2007) - Varvara 
 Silent Wedding (2008)
 The Princess and the Frog (2009) - Mama Odie (Romanian dub, speaking voice)
 State de România (2010) - Zenovia Popeanga, Marcel's mother
 Everybody in Our Family (2012)
 Rio 2'' (2014) - Aunt Mimi (Romanian dub)

References

External links

1929 births
Romanian people of Moldovan descent
2019 deaths
People from Bender, Moldova
Romanian film actresses
Romanian stage actresses
Romanian television actresses